Alex Deibold (born May 8, 1986) is an American snowboarder from Manchester, Vermont. Deibold won a bronze medal in snowboard cross at the 2014 Winter Olympics in Sochi, Russia.

Deibold who started snowboarding at the age of four, was a backup and wax technician at the 2010 Winter Olympic Games in Vancouver.
Deibold graduated from the Stratton Mountain School, Vermont in 2004. He attended with fellow Olympians Lindsey Jacobellis, Louie Vito, and Danny Davis.

References

External links 
 
 
 
 Alex Deibold at U.S. Ski & Snowboard
 

1986 births
Living people
American male snowboarders
Snowboarders at the 2014 Winter Olympics
Medalists at the 2014 Winter Olympics
Olympic bronze medalists for the United States in snowboarding
Olympic medalists in snowboarding
People from Manchester, Vermont
Sportspeople from Vermont
X Games athletes
20th-century American people
21st-century American people